Floreasca City Center is a multi-functional center with a shopping and entertainment complex as well as two office buildings in Bucharest. Floreasca City Center consists of a center for shopping, entertainment and business. It is the tallest building in Romania, with shopping-mall, entertainment, retail and offices. Located in Floreasca, an urban district and residential area in the northeast of Bucharest, SkyTower is close to another Raiffeisen evolution project, the Oracle Tower.

Construction works
Funding obtained from Raiffeisen Bank International was about €95.5-million. The project was constructed in stages.

Stage I : SkyTower
With 37 upper floors and 5 basement floors (gross floor area approximately ), this tower is the highest building in Bucharest. A restaurant and conference rooms are situated in the two uppermost floors. The facade of the Tower has an oblong structure over 4 floors with transparent, translucent and opaque areas. In the uppermost floors the facade opens up and becomes entirely transparent.

The ground floor features a generous entrance lobby, hosting reception and security desk and provides access to the upper floors via the security filter accessible by electronic card. The vertical access is ensured by ten elevators, out of which five are low-rise (up to the 18th floor) and five are high-rise (up to the 36th floor).

Each regular office floor is designed to host open space offices with afferent toilets and connections ready for installing the kitchenettes, accommodating up to 60 working stations, benefiting from a specially designed meeting area.

On June 6, 2012, SkyTower has reached the 36th floor and became the tallest building in Romania. The topping out ceremony was held on June 28, 2012.

Stage II : Office Wing
The Office Wing, an office building with 7 floors and a polygonal ground plan (gross floor area approximately ) floats above the shopping mall. This structure features a transparent light glass façade. In the floor connecting the structure with the mall, there is a fitness centre which has a direct exit to the generous open space on the roof of the shopping mall.

Stage III : Promenada mall

The mall received from the Austrian Society for Sustainable Buildings the "Gold" certificate issued according to OGNI/DGNB standards. Completion of Promenada shopping center, which will house about 120 shops, was finished in the late 2013. More than 50% of the space has been leased to internationally renowned retailers.

See also
List of tallest buildings in Romania

References

External links
Presentation site
SkyTower Bucharest
Live webcam – Layout
Developer site

Skyscraper office buildings in Bucharest
Office buildings completed in 2013
Buildings and structures completed in 2013